Do Not Disturb is the debut studio album from the dance-pop singer Joanne Accom released in 2001. It was a work in progress for two and a half years before it was released. The album reached No. 45 in Australia.

Regarding the album, Joanne stated, "It's basically just a lot of personal experiences and a lot of things that I've gone through, put into writing. It was a great opportunity for me to grow, not only as a vocalist, but also as a songwriter."

Track listing

Singles

References

2001 debut albums
Joanne Accom albums
Universal Music Group albums